Apujirca Punta (possibly from Quechua apu an Andean deity, hirka mountain, punta horn) is a  mountain in the Andes of Peru which reaches a height of approximately . It is located in the Huánuco Region, Huánuco Province, Churubamba District. Apujirca Punta lies northwest of Sagrahuagra and south of Machay.

References

Mountains of Peru
Mountains of Huánuco Region